Milton Isaiah Southard (October 20, 1836 – May 4, 1905) was a U.S. Representative from Ohio.

Born in Hanover, Ohio, Southard completed preparatory studies. He graduated from the Denison University, Granville, Ohio where he studied law.
He was admitted to the bar in 1863 and commenced practice in Toledo, Ohio. He served as prosecuting attorney for Muskingum County, Ohio, from 1867 to 1871.

Southard was elected as a Democrat to the Forty-third, Forty-fourth, and Forty-fifth Congresses (March 4, 1873 – March 3, 1879). He served as chairman of the Committee on Territories (Forty-fourth Congress). He moved to New York City and practiced law.

Southard died in Zanesville, Ohio, May 4, 1905. He was interred in Woodlawn Cemetery, Zanesville.

References

Sources

External links 
 

1836 births
1905 deaths
People from Licking County, Ohio
Politicians from Zanesville, Ohio
Ohio lawyers
New York (state) lawyers
County district attorneys in Ohio
Denison University alumni
Democratic Party members of the United States House of Representatives from Ohio
19th-century American politicians